Fraser Lake is a village in northern British Columbia, Canada. It's located on the southwest side of Fraser Lake between Burns Lake and Vanderhoof alongside the Yellowhead Highway.

The small community's population is primarily employed by either the forest industry. (Fraser Lake Sawmills, or various logging contractors) The Endako Mines, a large molybdenum mine was a former large employer.

The pioneer roots of the area's history date back to the fur trade, with the establishment in 1806 of a fur-trading post by Simon Fraser, at Fort Fraser near the east end of Fraser Lake. The modern day town was established in 1914, during the construction of the Grand Trunk Pacific Railway, and was incorporated as a village in 1966.

Fraser Lake is the hometown of Tianda Flegel, winner of The Next Star Season 2.

Demographics 

Directions
Fraser Lake is supported by nearby communities:

East (Hwy 16):
Fort Fraser - 21 km (13 mi)
Vanderhoof - 59 km (37 mi)
Prince George - 155 km (96 mi)

West (Hwy 16):
Burns Lake - 69 km (43 mi)
Topley - 120 km (75 mi)
Houston - 150 km (93 mi)
Smithers - 213 km (132 mi)
Terrace - 416 km (258 mi)
Prince Rupert - 560 km (348 mi)

North: East Hwy 16, North Hwy 27):
Fort St. James - 105 km (65 mi)

Climate
Fraser Lake is characterized by a continental climate meaning cold, snowy winters and cool to warm summers.

Notable people
 Tianda Flegel - winner of the second season of The Next Star.

References

External links

Hudson's Bay Company trading posts
Nechako Country
Populated places in the Regional District of Bulkley-Nechako
Villages in British Columbia